Aponte may refer to:

Surname: Galician and Portuguese: from a misdivision of Daponte, a topographic name from da ponte 'from the bridge'

Carlos Aponte, Colombian footballer
Christopher Aponte, American ballet dancer
Edwin David Aponte (born 1957), American historian and theologian
Gabriel Cano de Aponte (1665–1733), Spanish soldier and Royal Governor of Chile
Gianluigi Aponte (born 1940), Italian businessman
Javier Aponte Dalmau, Puerto Rican politician
José Aponte (disambiguation), several people
Luis Aponte (born 1953), Venezuelan baseball player
Luis Aponte Martínez (1922–2012), Puerto Rican Catholic cardinal
Manuel Alejandro Aponte Gómez (1974–2014), Mexican drug cartel leader
Mari Carmen Aponte (born 1946), American attorney and politician
Mike Aponte, American blackjack player
Ricardo Aponte (born c. 1949), United States Air Force general
Rick Aponte (born 1956), Dominican Republic baseball coach
Sergio Aponte Polito, Mexican Army general
Sylvia Rodríguez Aponte, Puerto Rican politician

Surnames